Christ Church Boys' Senior Secondary School were founded in the year 1870 as Church Schools, a distinction they continue to enjoy. At present, the school functions under the Board of Education, Church of North India, Jabalpur Diocese, Jabalpur. The Rt. Rev. Dr. Prem Chand Singh is the chairman of the board. The education imparted is based essentially on the quintessence of Christian ideals and principles. The School has served the society with extreme care, love and dedication to improve the lot of its children.

The School is affiliated with the Central Board of Secondary Education, New Delhi under the Affiliation No. 1030047 with the subject options of Science and Commerce Streams. The School also imparts education in Computer Studies.

At present Mr. Ladlie Mathew is the Principal of the School, which enjoys the strength of 3,000 students and 101 members on the teaching and office staff.

The schools website can be accessed at ccbsss.org

History 
The Christ Church School had its beginnings in the vestry of Christ Church in 1870, and was then known as Christ Church School. The school was founded on 1 November 1876 by Rev. Drawbridge. The school started with three students and now there are over 3,000 students at the school, and 101 members on the teaching and office staff. Mahant Swami Maharaj, the current president and the spiritual guru of BAPS is an alumnus.

The school has a separate branch for girls, named as Christ Church Girls' Senior Secondary School. These two schools are located on the opposite side of the same road. Earlier, the school delivered co-education, but later, it was split up into Boys' and Girls' school, both being affiliated to Central Board of Secondary Education now. Earlier the school was affiliated to MPBSE (MP Board) and CISCE. ICSE now functions as a separate wing named ICSE wing (Christ Church School for Boys and Girls) which  delivers co-education.

Sports and cultural activities 
The school has a special type of physical exercise termed as torchlight is a special highlight of the school. Since 1904 CE it is included in the annual sports in which burning torches are used to perform a scenic synchronised exercise. In 1928 D.V. Beatson added the Beatson exercise.

References

External links 
Christ Church Boys' Senior Secondary School (website)

Church of North India schools
Christian schools in Madhya Pradesh
High schools and secondary schools in Madhya Pradesh
Education in Jabalpur